is a Japanese writer of historical fiction. She has won the Naoki Prize and the Oda Sakunosuke Prize, and two of her novels have been adapted for television by NHK.

Early life and education 
Asai was born in 1959 in Habikino, Osaka, Japan. After graduating from Konan Women's University she took a job writing copy for advertising.

Career 
She chose the pen name "Makate" to honor her Okinawan grandmother. More novels followed, including the 2010 novel  and the 2012 novel , which NHK later adapted into a television series starring Rena Tanaka, Rie Tomosaka, and Eriko Sato.

In 2014 Asai won both the Naoki Prize and the Oda Sakunosuke Prize, but for different books. Her 2013 novel , a story based on the life of the poet Nakajima Utako, won the 150th Naoki Prize, which she shared with Kaoruko Himeno. Her book , a story based on the life of the poet Ihara Saikaku, won the 31st Oda Sakunosuke Prize.

Her novel , about the relationship between the painter Katsushika Ōi and her father, the painter Hokusai, was published in 2016. Kurara won the 22nd Gishū Nakayama Literature Prize, and was adapted into the 2017 NHK television movie  starring Aoi Miyazaki.

Recognition
 2018 Osaka Culture Prize
 2008 3rd Shōsetsu Gendai Novel Newcomer Encouragement Prize
 2014 150th Naoki Prize (2013下)
 2014 31st Oda Sakunosuke Prize
 2016 22nd Gishū Nakayama Literature Prize

Television adaptations
, NHK, 2017
, NHK, 2018

Works 
, Kodansha, 2008, 
, Kodansha, 2010, 
, Kodansha, 2012, 
, Kodansha, 2013, 
, Kodansha, 2014, 
, Shinchosha, 2016,

References

1959 births
Living people
21st-century Japanese novelists
21st-century Japanese women writers
Japanese women novelists
Naoki Prize winners
Writers from Osaka Prefecture
People from Habikino
Date of birth missing (living people)